A statue of Robin Hood is installed at Nottingham Castle, in Nottingham, England. The sculpture was unveiled in 1952.

References

External links
 

1952 establishments in England
1952 sculptures
Statue of Robin Hood
Statue of Robin Hood
Outdoor sculptures in England
Statue
Sculptures of men in the United Kingdom
Statues in England